Myxine glutinosa, known as the Atlantic hagfish in North America, and often simply as the hagfish in Europe, is a species of jawless fish of the genus Myxine.

Distribution
The distribution of Myxine glutinosa in the eastern Atlantic Ocean extends from the western Mediterranean Sea and Portugal to the North Sea, Skagerrak, Kattegat and the Varanger Fjord. It is also found in the western Atlantic Ocean from Baffin Island, Canada south to North Carolina. A related species, the Gulf hagfish (Eptatretus springeri), occurs in the Gulf of Mexico.

Description
There is a single gill slit on each side of the eel-like body. It has a total of 88–102 pores from which it can exude a slimy mucus. Hagfish have very flexible bodies which allow them to manipulate themselves into knots. The knots created by the hagfish remove mucous from the body, allow them to escape tight spaces, pull potential prey from burrows, and because they have no opposable jaws it helps create leverage while they eat.

Ecology
Hagfish such as M. glutinosa feed on the carcasses of fishes, which they bore into through any available opening.

References

Haney, W. A., Clark, A. J., & Uyeno, T. A. (2019). Characterization of body knotting behavior used for escape in a diversity of hagfishes. Journal of Zoology. doi: 10.1111/jzo.12752

External links
Hagfish Myxine glutinosa Linnaeus 1758, Fishes of the Gulf of Maine by Henry B. Bigelow and William C. Schroeder

Myxinidae
Fish of the North Atlantic
Fish described in 1758
Taxa named by Carl Linnaeus